Helcystogramma hystricella, the lanceolate helcystogramma moth, is a moth in the family Gelechiidae. It is found in the United States, where it has been recorded from Minnesota to Pennsylvania, south to Maryland and Kentucky, west to Oklahoma and Kansas.

The wingspan is 13–15 mm. The forewings are whitish or pale gray with dark lengthwise stripes and three dark spots in the median area. The inner margin is shaded with brown near base and the terminal line is dark. The hindwings are uniform whitish.

The larvae feed on grasses, including Elymus hystrix. They roll the leaves of their host plant. The species overwinters in the larval stage in a rolled leaf.

Etymology
The species name refers to the former generic name of the host plant Hystrix patula (now known as Elymus hystrix).

References

Moths described in 1921
hystricella
Moths of North America